Amber Pilley (born 8 December 1997) was an Australian rugby league footballer who played for the Brisbane Broncos in the NRL Women's Premiership and Burleigh Bears in the QRL Women's Premiership.

Background
Born in Campbelltown, New South Wales, Pilley moved to the Gold Coast, Queensland with her family when she was two. She played junior rugby league for the Nerang Roosters and is of Indigenous descent.

Playing career
In 2014, Pilley represented Australia in rugby sevens at the 2014 Summer Youth Olympics, winning a gold medal. In 2015, she represented the Indigenous All Stars. That year, she tore her anterior cruciate ligament (ACL) ruling her out for 12 months.

In 2017, Pilley joined the Burleigh Bears and represented the Indigenous All Stars. In June 2018, she played for South East Queensland at the Women's National Championships. In August 2018, she joined the Brisbane Broncos NRL Women's Premiership team.

In Round 1 of the 2018 NRL Women's season, Pilley made her debut for the Broncos in a 30–4 win over the St George Illawarra Dragons.

In 2020, Pilley missed the entire season after tearing her ACL, medial collateral ligament (MCL) and meniscus.

References

External links
Burleigh Bears profile

1997 births
Living people
Indigenous Australian rugby league players
Australian female rugby league players
Rugby league centres
Brisbane Broncos (NRLW) players
Rugby sevens players at the 2014 Summer Youth Olympics